The Rice Owls men's basketball program is the intercollegiate men's basketball program of Rice University. The program is classified in the NCAA's Division I, and the team competes in Conference USA. They previously participated in the Southwest Conference (1914–1996) and  the Western Athletic Conference (1996–2005).

The Owls play their home games in Tudor Fieldhouse, which they have called home since 1950. Previously known as Rice Gymnasium, it was renamed in honor of Rice alum Bobby Tudor, who spearheaded the 2008 renovation of the facility with a multimillion-dollar donation.  The court is designated "Autry Court" in memory of Mrs. James L. Autry.  Her husband James Lockhart Autry was a descendant of Micajah Autry, who was a hero of the Battle of the Alamo. Her daughter, Mrs. Edward W. Kelley, made a generous donation to the gymnasium building fund in honor of her late mother, an ardent supporter of Rice.

Head coaches

Postseason history

NCAA tournament results 
The Owls have appeared in four NCAA Tournaments. Their combined record is 2–5. Their drought of 53 years is the eighth longest drought between appearances in the NCAA Division I Tournament history.

NIT results 
The Owls have appeared in five National Invitation Tournaments. Their combined record is 1–6.

CIT results 
The Owls have appeared in one CollegeInsider.com Postseason Tournament (CIT). Their combined record is 2–1.

CBI results 
The Owls have appeared in three College Basketball Invitational (CBI) tournaments. Their combined record is 2–2.

Players of note

Owls in the NBA 
Morris Almond
Ken Austin
Bill Closs
Mike Harris
Bill Henry
Bob Kinney
Trey Murphy III
Ricky Pierce
Brent Scott
Mike Wilks

Owls in international basketball
Suleiman Braimoh (born 1989), Nigerian-American in the Israel Basketball Premier League
Egor Koulechov (born 1994), Israeli-Russian basketball player for Israeli team Ironi Nahariya

Retired numbers 

Rice University has retired six numbers.

References

External links
  

 
Basketball teams established in 1914